John Traynor (born 10 December 1966) is a Scottish former professional footballer who played as a defender.

Career
Born in Glasgow, Traynor played for Celtic Boys Club, Celtic, Clydebank, Ayr United and Auchinleck Talbot. After retiring as a professional, Ayr United gave Traynor a testimonial match against Newcastle United.

References

1966 births
Living people
Scottish footballers
Celtic F.C. players
Clydebank F.C. (1965) players
Ayr United F.C. players
Auchinleck Talbot F.C. players
Scottish Football League players
Association football defenders
Footballers from Glasgow